The Lyons Mail is a 1931 British historical mystery adventure film directed by Arthur Maude and starring John Martin Harvey, Norah Baring, and Ben Webster. It was based on the 1877 play The Lyons Mail by Charles Reade which in turn was based on his 1854 play The Courier of Lyons.  The film
was also released under the alternative title Courrier de Lyon. It had previously been made into a 1916 silent film The Lyons Mail. The story is based on the Courrier de Lyon case. It was shot at the Twickenham Studios in London. Filmed in 1930, it was to be leading actor John Martin-Harvey's only sound film.

Cast
 John Martin Harvey as Joseph Lesurques 
 Norah Baring as Julie
 Ben Webster as Jerome Lesurques
 Moore Marriott as Choppard
 George Thirlwell as Jean Didier
 Michael Hogan as Courrioll
 Sheila Wray as Madame Choppard
 Eric Howard as Fouinard
 Charles Paton as George Didier
 Earl Grey as Daubenton
 John Garside as Adjutant
 Gabrielle Casartelli as Maid

References

Bibliography
 Low, Rachael. Filmmaking in 1930s Britain. George Allen & Unwin, 1985.
 Wood, Linda. British Films, 1927-1939. British Film Institute, 1986.

External links

1931 films
1930s historical films
British historical films
British mystery films
1930s English-language films
Films directed by Arthur Maude
British films based on plays
Films shot at Twickenham Film Studios
British black-and-white films
1930s British films
Films set in France
Films set in the 18th century
Sound film remakes of silent films
Historical mystery films